Juan Cancio Barreto is a Paraguayan musician.

Beginnings

Barreto was born in Asunción, Paraguay on March 27, 1950. Son of Carmen Emategui and Rodolfo Barreto. He began to play the guitar at age 7, when a friend of his father, called Dario Duarte, also a musician, gave him a small guitar (requinto). His father showed him the basics and later a neighbour, Eufrasio Riveros, taught him to play. since then he never stopped playing that beautiful instrument.

At the age of 11, he met Efrén Echeverría, who became his teacher and inspired him to love and appreciate the folklore of Paraguay and particularly its music. The artist remembers his teacher with affection and gratitude.

Career

Other activities

Juan Cancio Barreto shared and received the example of Paraguayan musicians such as: Mauricio Cardozo Ocampo, Eladio Martínez, Diosnel Chase, Emilio Vaesken, Edmigio Ayala Báez, Samuel Aguayo, Agustín Barboza, Luis Alberto del Paraná and Faustino Brizuela.

Since the 80s he has been performing together with his son Juan Angel who is also a guitarist. Together with Juan Angel, they continue to reap success and popularity, gaining gold medals in the Festival de la Raza in the city of Villarrica.

He is currently serving as Director of Culture in the Municipality of Ciudad del Este.

During his frequent tours, he has conquered audiences in Paraguay and other countries. And nowadays he continues to travel to the interior of the country, to Argentina, Brazil and Chile, where he still receives awards and acknowledgments for his performances.

References

 Autobiography in  ABC Color 20 April 2009
 Diccionario de la música paraguaya. Juan Cancio Barreto.Asunción Paraguay
 Musica Paraguaya

Paraguayan musicians
Living people
1950 births
People from Asunción